Radio is a rural locality (a village) in Ishimbayevsky Selsoviet, Salavatsky District, Bashkortostan, Russia. The population was 129 as of 2010. There are 4 streets.

Geography 
Radio is located 31 km south of Maloyaz (the district's administrative centre) by road. Yakhya is the nearest rural locality.

References 

Rural localities in Salavatsky District